Catherine Patricia Foley  (born 10 November 1957) is an Australian physicist. She is the Chief Scientist of Australia (since  January 2021), before which she had been the chief scientist for the Commonwealth Scientific and Industrial Research Organisation (CSIRO) since August 2018.

Foley's research is in solid-state physics and its applications in superconductivity, combining material science, quantum physics, and research translation. In addition to her research science, she has also contributed significantly to the advancement of women in physics, and to professional scientific organisations.

Foley and her group at CSIRO have performed pioneering work on SQUID systems for geomagnetic exploration of minerals, which were transitioned to industry and resulted in the discovery of mineral ores worth many billions of dollars. "Her team is responsible for the development and commercialisation of LANDTEM which has led to the discovery of over $6B of mines worldwide."

Education
Foley attended Macquarie University for her undergraduate degrees, studying a Diploma of Education in high school physics (1979) and a Bachelor of Science majoring in physics (1980). She remained at Macquarie to do a PhD in physics (1984) investigating indium nitride, under the supervision of Trevor Tansley. She also spent six months on a scholarship as a research fellow, Department of Electrical Engineering, at Oregon State University, US, in Corvallis while writing up her PhD.

Career

CSIRO
Foley joined CSIRO in 1985 as a national research fellow and was promoted to senior research scientist in 1991, principal research scientist in 1996, senior principal research scientist in 2000, and chief research scientist in 2008. Dr Foley was also previously the deputy director of CSIRO's manufacturing business unit, as well as chief of the Division of Materials Science and Engineering in 2011 CSIRO's Materials Science and Engineering division.

Foley joined the editorial board of the physics journal Superconductor Science and Technology in 2003 and subsequently became its editor in chief.

Office of the Chief Scientist 
On 1 January 2021, Foley replaced Alan Finkel as Chief Scientist of Australia. She has stated as priorities: development of a national Open Access strategy, supporting emerging technologies (including establishing of a working group for quantum technologies), strengthening the role of the National Science & Technology Council in advising Government, and increasing understanding of scientific capability across Australian public service.

Research 
Foley made significant contributions for the comprehension of superconducting materials and to the evolution of devices that use superconductors to detect magnetic fields and locate deposits of minerals.

At Macquarie University, Foley and Tansley authored a series of highly regarded papers on indium nitride semiconductor films.  The work of Tansley and Dr Foley is considered central to the development of semiconductor lasers in the blue-green region of the spectrum.

Subsequently, her work at CSIRO lead to the development of high temperature superconducting Josephson junctions used in high-sensitivity magnetic field detectors used in applications such as underground deep mineral deposit detection.

Awards and accomplishments
Foley's awards include the 2015 Australian Academy of Science's Clunies-Ross Award, 2013 Premier's Award for Woman of the Year, and in 2011 the AUSIMM MIOTA prize. Preceding this award, she was a fellow of the Institute of Physics in the UK, past president of the Australian Institute of Physics, and a fellow of the Australian Academy of Technological Sciences and Engineering (ASTE). She has been president of Science and Technology Australia, where she represented 68,000 Australian scientists and technologists.

Foley was awarded a public service medal on Australia Day in 2003 and in the same year won the Eureka Prize for the promotion of science. She sits on the Scientific Advisory Committee of Australia's Centre for Future Low-Energy Electronics Technologies.

In May 2020 Foley was elected Fellow of the Australian Academy of Science and in the 2020 Queen's Birthday Honours she was made an Officer of the Order of Australia (AO) for "distinguished service to research science, to the advancement of women in physics, and to professional scientific organisations".

References

1957 births
Living people
CSIRO people
Chief Scientists of Australia
Australian materials scientists
Australian physicists
Fellows of the Institute of Physics
Macquarie University alumni
Australian women scientists
Officers of the Order of Australia
Recipients of the Public Service Medal (Australia)
Fellows of the Australian Academy of Technological Sciences and Engineering
Fellows of the Australian Academy of Science
Presidents of the Australian Institute of Physics